Candyland is the tenth studio album by Italian gothic metal band Theatres des Vampires, released through Scarlet Records on 14 October 2016. Initially announced on 7 July 2016, it is their first studio album in 5 years since Moonlight Waltz, and also their first release with guitarist Giorgio Ferrante, who replaced Stephan Benfante early in 2016. It is noticeably more guitar-driven than the band's previous releases with Sonya Scarlet on vocals, and its lyrics focus less on the vampiric and occult themes the band is famous for. A music video for the track "Morgana Effect" was uploaded to the band's official YouTube channel on 29 September 2016.

The album counts with guest appearances by Moonspell vocalist Fernando Ribeiro and J.T.R. Sickert frontman Tiziano Panini (a.k.a. Billy T. Cooper), Scarlet's husband.

Track listing

Critical reception
The album has received mostly positive reviews since its release. Writing for New Noise Magazine, Grim Lord gave it 3 out of 5 stars, comparing its sonority favorably to Lacuna Coil, Theatre of Tragedy, The Dreamside and "the gothic metal/rock of [his] younger days". However, he also stated that "[he] didn't find Scarlet's vocal approach to be to [his] taste in most songs" ("Pierrot Lunaire" excepted, which he thought of as "one of the disc's main standouts"), and commented on the lack of "occult-/Lilith-/Lucifer-style lyrics" as being "a kind of a drag". Matt Coe of Eternal Terror webzine rated the album with a 4 out of 6, and stated that "Candyland has multi-level appeal and should satisfy the long-timers while hopefully attain some new followers along the way".

Personnel
 Sonya Scarlet – vocals
 Zimon Lijoi – bass guitar
 Gabriel Valerio – drums
 Giorgio Ferrante – guitar
 Fernando Ribeiro – vocals (track 10)
 Billy T. Cooper (Tiziano Panini) – vocals (track 3)
 Francesco Sosto – keyboards, arrangements (track 7)
 Luca Bellanova – keyboards, arrangements (track 11)
 Elisa Pezzuto – backing vocals
 Christian Ice – production, mixing, mastering
 Daniele Pompei, Luca Cavallari – photography

References

2016 albums
Theatres des Vampires albums
Scarlet Records albums